Kirsty Louise Pearce (née McGee; born 16 April 1987) is a retired English footballer who played as a midfielder and defender for Reading F.C. In 2015, she captained the club to promotion to FA WSL 1 and was the General Manager for the side after retiring at the end of the 2018–19 season for the following two seasons.

References

External links
 Reading player profile

Living people
1987 births
English women's footballers
Women's association football midfielders
Women's Super League players
Reading F.C. Women players
Portsmouth F.C. Women players